2017 AFF Invitational Futsal Club Championship was the third edition of AFF Futsal Club Championship. The tournament was held in Bangkok, Thailand, from 3 to 9 July 2017. The futsal clubs from AFF member countries were invited to compete in this tournament. Thai Port (men) and Jaya Kencana Angels Futsal Club (women) were the title holders from the previous edition. For this edition, only the men's division was contested.

Participants

Group A

Group B

Venue

Group stage

Group A

Group B

Knockout stage

Bracket

Semi-finals

Third place match

Final

Winner

References

External links
 AFF FUTSAL CLUB CHAMPIONSHIP 2017, aseanfootball.org

AFF Futsal Club Championship
2017 in Asian futsal
International futsal competitions hosted by Thailand
2017 in Thai football
Sport in Bangkok
July 2017 sports events in Asia